James Raymond Haygood (July 20, 1882 – January 18, 1935) was an American football player, coach of football, basketball, and track, and college athletics administrator. He played for Dan McGugin's first Vanderbilt Commodores football team in 1904. Haygood served as the head football coach at Henderson-Brown College—now known as Henderson State University—from 1907 to 1918 and again from 1920 to 1924, at Florida Southern College from 1925 to 1927, and at Southwestern University—now known as Rhodes College—from 1931 to 1934.  Haygood died of a heart attack on January 18, 1935, in Little Rock, Arkansas.

Head coaching record

Football

References

External links
 

1882 births
1935 deaths
American football quarterbacks
Alabama Crimson Tide football coaches
Florida Southern Moccasins football coaches
Florida Southern Moccasins men's basketball coaches
Henderson State Reddies football coaches
Henderson State Reddies men's basketball coaches
Rhodes Lynx football coaches
Vanderbilt Commodores football players
Alabama Crimson Tide track and field coaches